The Frankfort Commercial Historic District in Frankfort, Kentucky is a  historic district which was listed on the National Register of Historic Places in 1979.  It included 86 contributing buildings and one contributing structure.

Included in the district are buildings on both sides of the Kentucky River.  These include:
Old State Capitol, designed by Gideon Shryock
Frankfort City Hall
Franklin County Courthouse, St. Clair Street, designed by Gideon Shryock
 Hampton-Williams House (1845), 101 West Main Street, built of stone in a pattern like Flemish bond brickwork
 Duvall Building, 221-223 St. Clair Street, Italianate-styled 
Oddfellows Lodge (1871), 315 Saint Clair Street
Old Farmers Bank (c.1851), 216 West Main Street, attributed to Isaiah Rogers, in Renaissance Revival style
Old State National Bank, 200 West Main Street, Beaux-Arts
Masonic Lodge (1893), 308 Ann Street, stone, designed by Clarke and Loomis in Romanesque style
D.C. Crutcher Building, 202-204 West Main Street, designed by Clarke and Loomis in Romanesque style
Singing Bridge

References

Historic districts on the National Register of Historic Places in Kentucky
Late 19th and Early 20th Century American Movements architecture
Commercial buildings completed in 1786
National Register of Historic Places in Frankfort, Kentucky